Vitorović (sometimes transliterated Vitorovich) is a Serbian surname that is most widespread in Čajetina and Nova Varoš.

Notable people with this surname include:

 Nicolas Vitorović (born 1990), Cypriot professional football coach and former player

References 

Serbian surnames